In radio-controlled aircraft, a hotliner is a fast sailplane with an electric motor. The range of what is often described as a hotliner varies from a sailplane with ailerons to 7000 watt competition F5b planes. General characteristics of a hotliner are:

 Sailplane with at least aileron and elevator control
 Electric motor
 Ability to climb at an angle of 70 degrees or more, usually vertical climbs.

Hotliners have been around since the early 1990s and became popular almost a decade later.

History 
The first hotliner was Hans-Dieter Levin's Aeronaut Sinus, described in a German magazine. Originally, hotliners were electric sailplanes with remotely controlled ailerons, capable of flying faster than the models of the period that only had rudder and elevator controls. Levin tested his Sinus with a Speed 600 motor and an 8x4.5?(diameter(inches)/pitch(incher per revolution)) prop and a 7 cell NiCad battery pack. In this configuration a climb at more than 70° was not possible. However, the term, hotliner, has since evolved to mean models with a fast climb rate. Aileron-equipped electric models which are not so fast are called warmliners.

Typically hotliners are launched at full throttle and reach a high altitude. From here the pilot cuts the motor and starts a series of maneuvers.

Radio-controlled aircraft